Robin MacPherson (born 1959, Glasgow, Scotland) is a filmmaker and was Chair in Creative Industries at the University of the Highlands and Islands before retiring.  Previously he was Professor of Screen Media at Edinburgh Napier University, director of Screen Academy Scotland (a Creative Skillset Film Academy partnership with Edinburgh College of Art) and of the Institute for Creative Industries at Edinburgh Napier.

Educated at Garthamlock Secondary School, Glasgow, and at the University of Stirling he entered the film and television industry in 1989 as a producer at Edinburgh Film Workshop Trust where he made documentary, current affairs and drama including the BAFTA-nominated half-hour drama, The Butterfly Man. In 1997, he established Asylum Pictures, an independent production company whose films include the Scottish-BAFTA nominated documentary, Tree Fellers, and (as co-producer) the award-winning Fellini: I'm a born liar.

After two years as Development Executive at Scottish Screen in 2002 he joined Edinburgh Napier University where, in 2005, he became the first Director of Screen Academy Scotland. From 2008 to 2015 he led ENGAGE, an EU MEDIA-funded collaboration with the Irish, Estonian and Finnish national film schools.

In 2010 he was appointed by the Scottish Government to the Board of Creative Scotland. on which he served until July 2015. In 2011 he was appointed as Director of the Institute for Creative Industries at Edinburgh Napier University. From 2011 to 2015 he was a member of the Board of Creative Edinburgh.

References

Living people
Film people from Glasgow
Academics of Edinburgh Napier University
Alumni of the University of Stirling
Scottish bloggers
Date of birth missing (living people)
1959 births